Cool for Cats may refer to:

 Cool for Cats (album), a 1979 album by Squeeze
 "Cool for Cats" (song), from the same album
 Cool for Cats (TV series), British TV series that featured music for a teenage audience, 1956–1961